was a legendary local ruler of Okinawa Island.

Gihon was the third and last ruler of the Shunten dynasty. He succeeded his father Shunbajunki at the age of 44, in 1248.

Gihon's reign was marked by terrible disasters, including famine, epidemics, and devastating typhoons. Around 1254, he appointed a young lord by the name of Eiso to be Regent (Sessei), and to aid in managing these disasters. Gihon felt personally responsible for the disasters and abdicated in 1259 or 1260, and shortly thereafter "withdrew into the forest alone." Eiso succeeded him as king and established a new dynasty. The precise location, date, and circumstances of Gihon's death are unknown, though it is safe to assume he died shortly after his abdication. Local legends allege that he was last seen at the cliffs of Hedo Point, the northernmost point on Okinawa Island, and his tomb is located nearby.

Notes

References
 Kerr, George H. (1965). Okinawa, the History of an Island People. Rutland, Vermont: C.E. Tuttle Co. OCLC  39242121
 Nussbaum, Louis-Frédéric. (2002).  Japan Encyclopedia. Cambridge: Harvard University Press. ; OCLC 48943301
Shinzato, Keiji, et al. Okinawa-ken no rekishi (History of Okinawa Prefecture). Tokyo: Yamakawa Publishing, 1996. p38.

1206 births
Year of death unknown
Kings of Ryūkyū
13th-century Ryukyuan people